Three ships of the United States Navy have been named USS San Juan. The first retained her mercantile name when acquired by the Navy; the latter two were named for the capital of Puerto Rico.
 The first  was acquired by the Navy from the San Juan Packing Company of Seattle and used as a minesweeper and patrol boat during World War I.
 The second  was an  anti-aircraft cruiser that served during World War II.
 The third  was the first of the "improved" s, capable of under-ice operations.

United States Navy ship names